Venetian Bird is a 1950 thriller novel by the British writer Victor Canning.

Film adaptation

In 1952 the story was turned into a film directed by Ralph Thomas and starring Richard Todd, Eva Bartok and Margot Grahame, with Canning adapting his own novel for the screenplay. In 1975, the novel was adapted by screenwriter Alfred Hayes into a two-part, eighth season episode of the CBS private eye TV series Mannix entitled "Bird of Prey". It was shot on Catalina island, doubling for a fictional Latin American country.

References

Bibliography
 Goble, Alan. The Complete Index to Literary Sources in Film. Walter de Gruyter, 1999.

1950 British novels
British thriller novels
Novels set in Venice
British novels adapted into films
Novels by Victor Canning
Hodder & Stoughton books